Zest Airways, Inc., operated as AirAsia Zest (formerly Asian Spirit and Zest Air), was a Filipino low-cost airline based at Ninoy Aquino International Airport in Pasay, Metro Manila in the Philippines. It operated scheduled domestic and international tourist services, mainly feeder services linking Manila and Cebu with 24 domestic destinations in support of the trunk route operations of other airlines.

The airline was founded as Asian Spirit, the first airline in the Philippines to be run as a cooperative. After its acquisition by AMY Holdings of businessman Alfredo Yao in 2008, the airline was rebranded as Zest Airways. In 2013, the airline was rebranded as AirAsia Zest and became an affiliate of Philippines AirAsia operating their brand separately.

The airline was merged together with AirAsia Philippines to form Philippines AirAsia in 2015.

History

Beginnings as Asian Spirit

Asian Spirit was established in September 1995 by Antonio "Toti" Turalba, Emmanuel "Noel" Oñate and Archibald Po, who contributed US$1 million each to start up the Airline Employees Cooperative (AEC). They arranged for 36 of their friends, mostly former Philippine Airlines employees, to run Asian Spirit through a salary-to-equity swap deal. The Po family held the majority of ownership.

It started operations in April 1996 with two second-hand Dash 7 aircraft servicing only one scheduled commercial route with two flights per day from Manila to Malay, serving the fledgling resort island of Boracay. To maximise its aircraft utilisation, it introduced new routes to the present-day towns of San Jose, Virac, Daet and Alcantara, and the cities of Cauayan and Masbate, regarded as secondary and tertiary routes by Air Transportation Office, and not serviced by major airlines. In 1997, the cooperative changed to a corporate set-up with the establishment of Asian Spirit, Inc., whose registration was approved by the Securities and Exchange Commission in 2005.

At the time, Asian Spirit has the distinction of being the first scheduled airline to serve Caticlan Airport, the nearest airport serving Boracay. Other operators served the airport on a charter basis then.  It became the Philippines' fourth flag carrier (after Philippine Airlines, Cebu Pacific and Air Philippines) in 2003.

The airline planned to fly to three international destinations to Sandakan, Malaysia from Zamboanga, to Seoul from Kalibo, Laoag, and Davao, and Macau from Angeles City. However these international routings never took off.  It also intended to commence international expansion to Bangkok in 2007.

Rebranding as Zest Airways

In January 2008, Asian Spirit was sold to AMY Holdings, a holding company controlled by businessman Alfredo Yao. The acquisition was completed on March 29 of that year. After the success of the takeover, Yao expressed interest in merging Asian Spirit with South East Asian Airlines (SEAIR). Yao had been expected to purchase a sixty percent stake in SEAIR, but the merger talks failed and both airlines continued to operate independently.

On September 30, 2008, Asian Spirit announced that it would be re-branding itself as Zest Airways to reflect the stake of the owner, Zest-O Corporation, in the airline. In 2009, Zest Airways intended to establish a hub at Diosdado Macapagal International Airport.

Partnership with AirAsia and merger

On March 11, 2013, Zest Airways signed a share swap agreement with AirAsia Philippines. The share swap deal involved exchange of shares between the owner of Zest Airways, Filipino shareholders of AirAsia Philippines, Inc. and AirAsia Berhad of Malaysia. On the same day, the airlines announced a strategic alliance that would integrate the operations of both airlines while still operating as separate entities. The deal closed on May 10, 2013.

On August 16, 2013, the Civil Aviation Authority of the Philippines (CAAP) suspended the airline's air operating certificate due to safety issues. The suspension was lifted on August 20.

Less than a year after the strategic alliance with AirAsia Philippines, on September 21, the airline was rebranded as "AirAsia Zest". During its initial phases, ZestAir's website carried an image of an aircraft featuring AirAsia's signature red livery and the Zest title on the body and AirAsia's signature red livery on the tail. The rebranded airline has a new theme "AirAsia Zest, the right way to fly."

AirAsia Zest eventually merged with AirAsia Philippines in 2015 to form Philippines AirAsia. This merger effectively phased out the AirAsia Zest brand. Both airlines completed the transition to a single operating certificate in September of that year. AirAsia Zest then ceased operations on December 6, 2015.

Destinations

Fleet
AirAsia Zest and its predecessors operated the following aircraft during its existence:

Accidents and incidents

As Asian Spirit
December 7, 1999: Asian Spirit Flight 100, a Let L-410, crashed between Kasibu in Nueva Vizcaya and Cabarroguis in Quirino, killing all 15 passengers on board and 2 crew. The plane was headed for Cauayan Airport in Cauayan.  The accident forced the closure of the Manila-Cauayan route, which remained closed until Philippine Airlines restarted the route on August 15, 2008.
September 4, 2002: Asian Spirit Flight 897 was the last flight of the day to Malay, departing Manila at 3:36pm for a one-hour flight. During the approach to Malay, the right main gear failed to deploy. The approach was abandoned and the crew decided to return to Manila for an emergency landing. The plane circled for about 35 minutes over Las Piñas to burn off fuel. The crew then carried out an emergency landing with the right gear retracted on Manila's international airport runway 24. After touchdown the aircraft swerved off the runway onto a grassy area.
November 14, 2005: Asian Spirit Flight 587, a BAe-146-200, reportedly hydroplaned and overran runway 04/22, a 4,429-foot (1350 m) long concrete runway at Catarman National Airport. The aircraft came to rest in a muddy rice field.
January 2, 2008, Asian Spirit Flight 321, an NAMC YS-11 departing from Manila, overshot the runway at Masbate Airport at 7:30am, due to heavy tailwinds with gusts reaching 14 knots while landing on runway 21. Although none of the 47 passengers were seriously injured, the aircraft was badly damaged.

As Zest Airways
January 11, 2009: a Xian MA60 operated crashed at Caticlan Airport while trying to land. The aircraft landed too short on the runway, skidded out of control and crashed into a concrete barrier. The aircraft caught fire and suffered extensive damage to its wing, landing gear, undercarriage and one engine. Several passengers were injured in that accident.
June 25, 2009: a Xian MA60 operated by Zest overshot the runway while trying to land at Caticlan Airport. As a consequence of this accident, the runway was lengthened and a hill that obstructs one of its approaches was flattened.

As AirAsia Zest
December 30, 2014: AirAsia Zest Flight 272, an Airbus A320-200 registered RP-C8972, overshot the runway during landing at Kalibo International Airport. All 159 passengers and crew survived uninjured.

See also

References

External links

 AirAsia Zest
 Zest Airways (archive)
 Asian Spirit (archive)
 AirAsia Zest Fleet

Defunct airlines of the Philippines
Airlines established in 1995
Airlines disestablished in 2015
Airlines formerly banned in the European Union
AirAsia
Employee-owned companies
Defunct low-cost airlines
Companies based in Pasay
1995 establishments in the Philippines
2015 disestablishments in the Philippines
Philippine companies established in 1995